Sin/Pecado is the third studio album by Portuguese gothic metal band Moonspell, released in 1998.

Track listing

Personnel 
 Fernando Ribeiro – vocals
 Ricardo Amorim – guitars
 Pedro Paixão – synths, samplers, programming
 Miguel Gaspar – drums

Additional personnel
 Sérgio Crestana – bass
 Birgit Zacher – vocals on "Flesh"
 Miriam Carmo – model
 Markus Freiwald – pre-production
 Rolf Brenner – cover art, design, photography
 Siggi Bemm – mixing
 Waldemar Sorychta – producer, mixing
 Carsten Drescher – art director

Charts

References 

1998 albums
Moonspell albums
Century Media Records albums
Albums produced by Waldemar Sorychta